Saharanpur division is an administrative geographical unit of Uttar Pradesh state of India. The city of Saharanpur is the administrative headquarters of the division.

Administrative jurisdiction 
This division has three districts under its jurisdiction: Saharanpur, Shamli and Muzaffarnagar.

See also
 Shakambhari, a temple area north of Saharanpur
 North India, the region in which Saharanpur lies

References

External links 
 Saharanpur Official website
 Saharanpur History in the Imperial Gazetteer of India, 1909

Divisions of Uttar Pradesh
Saharanpur division

de:Saharanpur
hi:सहारनपुर
bpy:শাহরানপুর
it:Saharanpur
pam:Saharanpur
mr:सहारनपुर
ja:サハーランプル
pl:Saharanpur
fi:Saharanpur
sv:Saharanpur
vi:Saharanpur